Snowflake High School is one of the oldest schools in Arizona. It was founded in the late 19th century for the education of Snowflake's youth. In 1888 the Snowflake Stake Academy was established to provide education beyond the 8th grade for all who cared to attend.  It was established by The Church of Jesus Christ of Latter-day Saints as part of its Church Educational System.  In 1924, the Snowflake Union High School District was created and the Stake Academy was closed.

Snowflake High School is part of Snowflake Unified School District which serves Snowflake, Arizona and neighboring Taylor, Arizona.

Snowflake High School hosts the town's annual Groundhog breakfast.

Notable alumni 
Sylvia Allen - Arizona State legislature
Jake Flake - Arizona State legislature
Jeff Flake - US Senator

State Championships 

 Golf: 2009, 2008, 2005, 2004, 1998, 1997, 1994, 1993, 1985
 Football: 2021,2020, 1993, 1992, 1991, 1988, 1986, 1982
 Boys' Basketball: 2015, 1989, 1984, 1982
 Girls' Basketball: 1997, 1991, 1984, 1982, 1980, 1977
 Boys' Track and Field: 2021, 2017, 2016, 2015, 2007, 2005, 2004, 1959
 Girls' Track and Field: 2021, 2018,2019
 Wrestling: 1982
 Baseball: 1987, 1981, 1970
 Softball: 2001, 1989, 1987, 1986
 Volleyball: 1996, 1991, 1981, 1980

References 

Public high schools in Arizona
Schools in Navajo County, Arizona
Educational institutions established in 1888
1888 establishments in Arizona Territory